Alicia Castro (born ) is a Mexican female volleyball player. She was part of the Mexico women's national volleyball team.

She participated in the 2010 Women's Pan-American Volleyball Cup.

References

External links
 http://www.fivb.org/EN/volleyball/competitions/Youth/Women/2011/Teams.asp?Tourn=MJ2011&Team=MEX
 http://www.fivb.org/EN/volleyball/competitions/Youth/Women/2011/viewpressrelease.asp
 http://www.norceca.net/April.29.2012_Mexico%20outduels%20Costa%20Rica%20in%20opening%20day.htm

1994 births
Living people
Mexican women's volleyball players
Place of birth missing (living people)